Jaco van der Westhuyzen (born 6 April 1978) is a South African former professional rugby union footballer who played fly-half or fullback.

Early life
Born  in Groblersdal, Mpumalanga province, South Africa, van der Westhuyzen was educated at Ben Viljoen High School, Groblersdal, van der Westhuyzen studied law at the University of Natal (Pietermaritzburg) and through UNISA. Van der Westhuyzen has played for South Africa A, U23s and U21s (helping them to the Sanzar title in Argentina in 2000), as well as the South African Barbarians in 2001 and South Africa Schools in 1996.

Professional rugby career
Played in both the Currie Cup (scoring 96 points in 21 games) and then making his Super 12 debut in 1997 as a 19-year-old. He was unable to cement himself a place in the starting line-up, and moved north to the Mpumalanga Pumas where he came under the eye of ex-Springbok centre Danie Gerber.

Van der Westhuyzen was first capped for the Springboks in the 2000 Tri Nations tournament against New Zealand as a replacement, but a knee injury after his first two tests curtailed his international career.

Van der Westhuyzen then moved to the Pretoria-based Blue Bulls in 2001 helping them to the Vodacom Cup in his first year then, still playing as a fly-half, claiming the Currie Cup title in 2002. He was named the South African Super 12 Player of the Year following the Bulls’ sixth-place finish in the competition – the highest of any South African team in 2003. He returned to the Bulls in 2006 after stints at Leicester Tigers and NEC Green Rockets. He has been played mainly at fullback since his return; Morné Steyn and Derick Hougaard are currently well-established as the team's fly-halves.

He scored his debut international try against Samoa in Brisbane in the 2003 Rugby World Cup, after he was called into the South African squad as a late replacement.

In 2006, van der Westhuyzen was part of the Springboks side that was thrashed 49–0 by the Wallabies, in their opening Tri Nations match. van der Westhuyzen made many handling errors during the match, leading to Butch James to be brought into the side. One of van der Westhuyzen's errors involved him dropping the ball and after in the bounced, kick it, claiming to the referee that he was attempting a drop goal. Later, van der Westhuyzen claimed he "needed to think of something".

Leicester Tigers
After the 2003 Rugby World Cup he joined Leicester Tigers, where he initially was brought in as a fullback to replace Tim Stimpson. However, he was soon switched to fly-half, following in the tradition of Joel Stransky. His performances earned him a recall to the Springbok side in 2004. Van Der Westhuyzen made a total of 12 appearances, scoring 33 points for the Tigers.

NEC Green Rockets
Despite attempts by Leicester to keep him at the club, he decided to honour a contract he had signed with NEC Green Rockets in Japan and was registered from 2004 to 2009.

Return to Bulls
In 2010 van der Westhuyzen rejoined Bulls for the 2010 Super 14 season.

Beliefs
Van der Westhuyzen is a devout Christian. He claims his knee injury was miraculously healed by prayer when he visited T.B. Joshua, pastor of The Synagogue, Church of All Nations in Lagos, Nigeria. According to him he was cured from a career threatening knee ligament injury immediately following the prayer.

Achievements
 SANZAR u21 Championship with South Africa Under-21 1999.
 Currie Cup 2002 with Blue Bulls.
 Superrugby winner 2007 & 2010 (Bulls)
 Tri Nations 2004, with South Africa.

References

External links
Profile at the Springbok Rugby Hall of Fame
Profile at sarugby.com

South African rugby union players
South Africa international rugby union players
Rugby union fly-halves
Rugby union fullbacks
Leicester Tigers players
Green Rockets Tokatsu players
Expatriate rugby union players in Japan
1978 births
Living people
University of South Africa alumni
Bulls (rugby union) players
Blue Bulls players
Pumas (Currie Cup) players
Sharks (Currie Cup) players
Sharks (rugby union) players
People from Mbombela
South African expatriate rugby union players
South African expatriate sportspeople in Japan
South African Christians
White South African people
Rugby union players from Mpumalanga